The women's 10 metre air rifle event at the 2018 Asian Games in Palembang, Indonesia took place on 20 August at the Jakabaring International Shooting Range.

Schedule
All times are Western Indonesia Time (UTC+07:00)

Records

Results
Legend
DNS — Did not start

Qualification

Final

References

External links
Shooting 10m Air Rifle Women
 Results at asia-shooting.org

Women's 10 metre air rifle